My Salinger Year (also known as My New York Year) is a 2020 drama film written and directed by Philippe Falardeau, based upon the memoir of the same name by Joanna Rakoff. It stars Margaret Qualley, Sigourney Weaver, Douglas Booth, Seána Kerslake, Colm Feore and Brían F. O'Byrne.

The film had its world premiere at the 70th Berlin International Film Festival on February 20, 2020. It was released in Canada and the United States on March 5, 2021, by Mongrel Media and IFC Films, respectively, and in Ireland on May 21, 2021, by Vertigo Releasing.

Plot
In 1995, Joanna, an aspiring writer and poet, leaves Berkeley, California, as well as her boyfriend, Karl, and moves to New York City, where she takes a job at one of New York's oldest literary agencies, run by Margaret. Unbeknownst to Joanna, the agency looks after the interests of the notoriously reclusive writer J. D. Salinger. She has not read any of Salinger's books, not even The Catcher in the Rye. She moves into an apartment with a new boyfriend, Don. Margaret does not believe that computers are helpful and makes Joanna type letters for her using a typewriter.

In her time at the agency, Joanna's responsibilities include responding to the large volume of fan mail that Salinger is sent. As was agency policy, Joanna responds with a generic response that explained that Salinger did not read fan mail. However, she is tempted to give a proper reply to some of Salinger's fans. Her period at the agency coincides with Salinger's proposed publication of the short story "Hapworth 16, 1924", which had previously been published in The New Yorker. She helps liaise with the small publisher and goes to Georgetown University for a meeting between Salinger and the publisher, which coincides with a concert that Karl, her old boyfriend, is performing in Washington, D.C. Margaret starts to trust Joanna more and lets her read some manuscripts and articles. Don and Joanna are invited to the wedding of Don's best friend, but Don does not initially tell Joanna as he wants to go on his own. While Don is away, Joanna decides to leave him and move out. Joanna sells her first book for the agency and is offered a bigger role at the agency. However, she wants to pursue her dream of becoming a writer and quits.

Cast

Production
The film is based on Rakoff's 2014 memoir depicting her time working at literary agency Harold Ober Associates, which represented Salinger. Phyllis Westberg (a character called Margaret in the film) was Salinger's agent at the time that Rakoff was at the agency, and Westberg took over running the agency in 1998.

In February 2019, Margaret Qualley and Sigourney Weaver joined the cast of the film, with Philippe Falardeau directing from a screenplay he wrote. Qualley was to star as Rakoff and Weaver as Margaret, Rakoff's boss. Kim McCraw, Susan Mullen, Luc Déry and Ruth Coady served as producers under their micro_scope and Parallel Films banner, respectively. In May 2019, Colm Feore, Seána Kerslake and Théodore Pellerin joined the cast of the film, with Mongrel Media and Thunderbird Releasing distributing in Canada and Ireland;  principal photography began that month in Montreal.

Release
The film had its world premiere at the 70th Berlin International Film Festival on February 20, 2020. Shortly after, IFC Films acquired distribution rights to the film. It was released in Canada and the United States on March 5, 2021, by Mongrel Media and IFC Films, respectively. In Ireland, the film was released on May 17, 2021, by Vertigo Releasing.

Reception
According to Metacritic, which sampled 18 critics and calculated a weighted average score of 50 out of 100, the film received "mixed or average reviews".

Gary Goldstein of the Los Angeles Times gave the film a positive review, writing: "Joanna's journey of creative and emotional enlightenment, is managed with grace, tenderness and touching credibility by a wonderfully winning Qualley in concert with Philippe Falardeau's smart, engaging direction and screenplay." Kevin Maher of The Sunday Times also gave the film a positive review writing: "But really it's a movie, essentially familiar in structure and tone, that owes everything to a pair of knockout performances. It's a casting triumph."

On the other hand, Peter Bradshaw of The Guardian panned the film, awarding it one out of five stars and calling it a "bafflingly insipid, zestless, derivative film – a simperingly coy knock-off of The Devil Wears Prada without the sexiness and fun."

Critic Jackson "LightsCameraJackson" Murphy declared the film to be one of the top ten films of 2021.

Awards and nominations

References

External links

My Salinger Year at Library and Archives Canada

 
2020 films
2020 drama films
Canadian drama films
English-language Canadian films
Irish drama films
English-language Irish films
Films about literature
Films based on non-fiction books
Films directed by Philippe Falardeau
Films set in the 1990s
Films set in 1995
Films set in Manhattan
Films set in Washington, D.C.
Films shot in Montreal
J. D. Salinger
IFC Films films
Films about writers
2020s English-language films
2020s Canadian films